James Richard Abe Bailey,  (23 October 1919 – 29 February 2000) was an Anglo-South African World War II fighter pilot, writer, poet and publisher. He was the founder of Drum, the most widely read magazine in Africa.

Biography

Born in London on 23 October 1919, Bailey was the son of Sir Abe Bailey and pioneer aviator Dame Mary Bailey, and was educated at Winchester College and Christ Church, Oxford. At the outbreak of the Second World War, he was called up from the Oxford University Air Squadron and joined the Royal Air Force as a pilot in September 1939. He served with 264, 600 and 85 Squadrons, flying Defiants, Hurricanes and Beaufighters.

Drum and Golden City Post
In 1951 he provided financial backing to Bob Crisp to start a magazine called African Drum based in Cape Town, and aimed at a Black readership, but as readership dropped, Bailey took full control. The monthly magazine was renamed to simply Drum and the head office moved to Johannesburg. Anthony Sampson was appointed editor. Bailey also founded in 1955 the Golden City Post, the country's first black Sunday tabloid.

The God-Kings and Titans
Bailey's book The God-Kings and the Titans: The New World Ascendancy in Ancient Times (1973) was a controversial work on pre-Columbian trans-oceanic contact, which claimed that thousands of years before Columbus Mediterranean sea voyagers among other peoples from the Old World landed on both the Atlantic and Pacific shores of America. The book has been referenced by many pseudohistoric writers.

Death
Bailey died in 2000, aged 80, from colon cancer. He was survived by his second wife, Barbara (née Epstein, whom he married in 1962), and by four children.

Writing
 As In Flight (1961)
 National Ambitions (1958)
 Eskimo Nel (1964)
 The God-Kings and Titans (1973)
 The Sky Suspended (1990)
 The Poetry of a Fighter Pilot (1993)
 Sailing to Paradise (1993)

References

1919 births
2000 deaths
British emigrants to South Africa
White South African people
Alumni of Christ Church, Oxford
Commanders of the Order of the British Empire
Royal Air Force pilots of World War II
South African male poets
South African publishers (people)
Place of birth missing
Pseudohistorians
Deaths from colorectal cancer
Recipients of the Distinguished Flying Cross (United Kingdom)
South African World War II flying aces
Pre-Columbian trans-oceanic contact
Younger sons of baronets
20th-century South African historians
20th-century South African poets